Senator Grooms may refer to:

Larry Grooms (born 1964), South Carolina Senate
Ron Grooms (born 1944), Indiana Carolina Senate